James J. DeRan Jr. (October 5, 1906 – February 28, 1986) was an American politician from Maryland. He served as a member of the Maryland House of Delegates, representing Harford County, from 1943 to 1950.

Early life
James J. DeRan Jr. was born on October 5, 1906, at Clover Lick, West Virginia or Woodstock, Virginia, sources differ. He moved to Pylesville, Maryland, as a child. His father was a Harford County commissioner in the 1930s. DeRan graduated Highland High School in Street, Maryland. He graduated from the University of Maryland with a bachelor's degree in 1928. While at the University of Maryland, he played lacrosse.

Career
DeRan was a Democrat. DeRan served as a member of the Maryland House of Delegates, representing Harford County, from 1943 to 1950.

DeRan worked in the real estate and insurance business.

Personal life
DeRan married Helen Harry. They had four sons and one daughter, James J. III, C. Harry, John P., David H. and Sara A. His wife died in 1981. DeRan was a member and elder at Highland Presbyterian Church.

DeRan died of influenza on February 28, 1986, at Citizens Nursing Home in Havre de Grace, Maryland.

References

Place of birth missing
1906 births
1986 deaths
People from Harford County, Maryland
University System of Maryland alumni
Democratic Party members of the Maryland House of Delegates
American real estate businesspeople
Presbyterians from Maryland
Deaths from influenza